Ben Lomond is an unincorporated community in Mason County, West Virginia, United States.

A CSX Transportation line — which was formerly part of the Baltimore & Ohio Railroad — runs through the community. Ben Lomond once had a post office, which is now closed. The community was named for the Scottish mountain Ben Lomond.

References

Unincorporated communities in Mason County, West Virginia
Unincorporated communities in West Virginia
West Virginia populated places on the Ohio River